Colasposoma sumptuosum is a species of leaf beetle of Tanzania and the Democratic Republic of the Congo. It was first described from Kigonsera by Julius Weise in 1906.

References 

sumptuosum
Beetles of the Democratic Republic of the Congo
Taxa named by Julius Weise
Insects of Tanzania
Beetles described in 1906